Merrill Lynch & Co., formally Merrill Lynch, Pierce, Fenner & Smith Incorporated, was a publicly-traded American investment bank that existed independently from 1914 until January 2009 before being acquired by Bank of America and rolled into BofA Securities.

The firm engaged in prime brokerage and broker-dealer activities and was headquartered in New York City, occupying the entire 34 stories of 250 Vesey Street. The company agreed to be acquired by Bank of America on September 14, 2008, at the height of the Financial crisis of 2007–2008, the same weekend that Lehman Brothers was allowed to fail. The acquisition was completed in January 2009 and Merrill Lynch & Co., Inc. was merged into Bank of America Corporation in October 2013.

History

Founding and early history
The company was founded on January 6, 1914, when Charles E. Merrill opened Charles E. Merrill & Co. for business at 7 Wall Street in New York City. A few months later, Merrill's friend, Edmund C. Lynch, joined him, and in 1915 the name was officially changed to Merrill, Lynch & Co. At that time, the firm's name included a comma between Merrill and Lynch, which was dropped in 1938 In 1916, Winthrop H. Smith joined the firm.

In 1921, the company purchased Pathé Exchange, which later became RKO Pictures. In 1926, the firm acquired a controlling interest in Safeway Inc., transforming the small grocery store into the country's third largest grocery store chain by the early 1930s.

In 1930, Merrill led the firm through a major restructuring, spinning-off the company's retail brokerage business to E. A. Pierce & Co. (formerly A. H. Housman & Co.) to focus on investment banking. Along with the business, Merrill also transferred the bulk of its employees, including Lynch and Winthrop H. Smith. Charles Merrill received a minority interest in E.A. Pierce in the transaction. Throughout the 1930s, E.A. Pierce remained the largest brokerage in the US. The firm, led by Edward A. Pierce, Lynch, and Smith would also prove one of the most innovative in the industry, introducing IBM machines into the business' record keeping. Additionally, by 1938, E.A. Pierce would control the largest wire network with a private network of over 23,000 miles of telegraph wires. These wires were typically used for orders.

Despite its strong position in the market, E.A. Pierce was struggling financially in the 1930s and was thinly capitalized. Following the death of Lynch in 1938, Smith began discussions with Merrill, who owned a minority interest in E.A. Pierce, about a possible merger of the two firms. On April 1, 1940, Merrill Lynch merged with E. A. Pierce & Co. and Cassatt & Co., a Philadelphia-based brokerage firm in which both Merrill Lynch and E.A. Pierce held an interest. and was briefly known as Merrill Lynch, E. A. Pierce, and Cassatt. The company became the first on Wall Street to publish an annual fiscal report in 1941.

In 1941, Merrill Lynch, E. A. Pierce and Cassatt merged with Fenner & Beane, a New Orleans-based investment bank and commodities company. Throughout the 1930s, Fenner & Beane was consistently the second largest securities firm in the US. The combined firm, which became the clear leader in securities brokerage in the US, was renamed Merrill Lynch, Pierce, Fenner & Beane.

Post-war years
In 1952, the company formed Merrill Lynch & Co. as a holding company and officially incorporated after nearly half a century as a partnership. On December 31, 1957, The New York Times referred to that name as "a sonorous bit of Americana" and said "After sixteen years of popularizing [it], Merrill Lynch, Pierce, Fenner, and Beane is going to change it—and thereby honor the man who has been largely responsible for making the name of a brokerage house part of an American saga," said about Winthrop H. Smith, who had been running the company since 1940. The merger made the company – Merrill Lynch, Pierce, Fenner & Smith Inc. – the largest securities firm in the world, with offices in over 98 cities and membership on 28 exchanges. At the start of the firm's fiscal year on March 1, 1958, the firm's name became "Merrill Lynch, Pierce, Fenner & Smith" and the company became a member of the New York Stock Exchange.

In 1964, Merrill Lynch acquired C. J. Devine & Co., the leading dealer in US Government Securities. The merger came together due to the death of Christopher J. Devine in May 1963. The C. J. Devine & Co. partners, referred to as "The Devine Boys", formed Merrill Lynch Government Securities Inc., giving the firm a strong presence in the government securities market. The Government Securities business brought Merrill Lynch the needed leverage to establish many of the unique money market products and government bond mutual fund products responsible for much of the firm's growth in the 1970s and 1980s.

Close of the 20th century
The brokerage also had partners in Canada interested in the retail investment business for a number of years, until selling this subsidiary to CIBC Wood Gundy in 1990. With its purchase of Midland Walwyn Inc in June 1998, Merrill Lynch re-entered the Canadian investment business. At the time, Canada was the seventh-largest market for personal investment. But in December 2001, Merrill Lynch sold Midland Walwyn to CIBC Wood Gundy.

In 2003, Merrill Lynch became the second-largest shareholder of the Japanese animation studio TMS Entertainment. In a report to the Finance Ministry, the Merrill Lynch group said it had acquired a 7.54 percent stake in TMS by purchasing some 3.33 million shares. Merrill Lynch purchased the stake purely for investment purposes and had no intention of acquiring control of the firm's management.

Rise to prominence
Merrill Lynch rose to prominence on the strength of its network of 15,000 financial advisors, sometimes referred to as the "thundering herd", that allowed it to place securities it underwrote directly. In contrast, many established Wall Street firms, such as Morgan Stanley, relied on groups of independent brokers for placement of the securities they underwrote. Until as late as 1970, it was known as the "Catholic" firm of Wall Street. The firm went public in 1971 and became a multinational corporation with over $1.8 trillion in client assets, operating in more than 40 countries around the world. In 1977, the company introduced its Cash Management Account (CMA), which enabled customers to sweep all their cash into a money market mutual fund, and included check-writing capabilities and a credit card. In 1978, it significantly buttressed its securities underwriting business by acquiring White Weld & Co., a small but prestigious old-line investment bank. Merrill Lynch was well known for its Global Private Client services and its strong sales force.

Orange County settlement
Merrill Lynch settled with Orange County, California, for $400 million to settle accusations that it sold inappropriate and risky investments to former county treasurer Robert Citron. Citron lost $1.69 billion, which forced the county to file for bankruptcy in December 1994. The county sued a dozen or more securities companies, advisors and accountants, but Merrill settled without admitting liability in June 1998. The county was able to recover about $600 million in total, including $400 million from Merrill.

Subprime mortgage crisis

In November 2007, Merrill Lynch announced it would write-down $8.4 billion in losses associated with the subprime mortgage crisis, and would remove E. Stanley O'Neal as its chief executive. O'Neal had earlier approached Wachovia about a merger without prior Board approval, but the talks ended after O'Neal's dismissal. Merrill Lynch named John Thain as its new CEO that month. In his first days at work in December 2007, Thain made changes in Merrill Lynch's top management, announcing that he would bring in former New York Stock Exchange (NYSE) colleagues such as Nelson Chai as CFO and Margaret D. Tutwiler as head of communications. Later that month, the firm announced it would sell its commercial finance business to General Electric, and would sell off major shares of its own stock to Temasek Holdings, a Singapore government investment group, in an effort to raise capital. The deal raised over $6 billion.

In July 2008, Thain announced $4.9 billion fourth quarter losses for the company from defaults and bad investments in the ongoing mortgage crisis. In one year between July 2007 and July 2008, Merrill Lynch lost $19.2 billion, or $52 million daily. The company's stock price had also declined significantly during that time. Two weeks later, the company announced the sale of select hedge funds and securities in an effort to reduce their exposure to mortgage related investments. Temasek Holdings agreed to purchase the funds and increase its investment in the company by $3.4 billion.

Andrew Cuomo, New York Attorney General, threatened to sue Merrill Lynch in August 2008 over its misrepresentation of the risk on mortgage-backed securities. A week earlier, Merrill Lynch had offered to buy back $12 billion in auction-rate debt and said it was surprised by the lawsuit. Three days later, the company froze hiring and revealed that it had charged almost $30 billion in losses to its subsidiary in the United Kingdom, exempting them from taxes in that country. On August 22, 2008, CEO John Thain announced an agreement with the Massachusetts Secretary of the Commonwealth to buy back all auction-rate securities from customers with less than $100 million in deposits with the firm, beginning in October 2008 and expanding in January 2009. On September 5, 2008 Goldman Sachs downgraded Merrill Lynch's stock to "conviction sell" and warned of further losses at the company. Bloomberg reported in September 2008 that Merrill Lynch had lost $51.8 billion on mortgage-backed securities as part of the subprime mortgage crisis.

CDO controversies
Merrill Lynch, like many other banks, became heavily involved in the mortgage-based collateralized debt obligation (CDO) market in the early 2000s. According to an article in Credit magazine, Merrill's rise to be the leader of the CDO market began in 2003 when Christopher Ricciardi brought his CDO team from Credit Suisse First Boston to Merrill. In 2005 Merrill took out advertisements in the back of Derivatives Week magazine, touting the fact that its Global Markets and Investing Group was the "#1 global underwriter of CDOs in 2004". To provide a ready supply of mortgages for the CDOs, Merrill purchased First Franklin Financial Corp., one of the largest subprime lenders in the country, in December 2006. Between 2006 and 2007, Merrill was lead underwriter on 136 CDOs worth $93 billion. By the end of 2007, the value of these CDOs was collapsing, but Merrill had held onto portions of them, creating billions of dollars in losses for the company. In mid-2008, Merrill sold a group of CDOs that had once been valued at $30.6 billion to Lone Star Funds for $1.7 billion in cash and a $5.1 billion loan.

In April 2009, bond insurance company MBIA sued Merrill Lynch for fraud and five other violations. These were related to the credit default swap "insurance" contracts Merrill had bought from MBIA on four of Merrill's mortgage-based collateralized debt obligations. These were the "ML-Series" CDOs, Broderick CDO 2, Highridge ABS CDO I, Broderick CDO 3, and Newbury Street CDO. MBIA claimed, among other things, that Merrill defrauded MBIA about the quality of these CDOs, and that it was using the complicated nature of these particular CDOs (CDOs squared and cubed) to hide the problems it knew about in the securities that the CDOs were based on. However, in 2010 Justice Bernard Fried disallowed all but one of the charges: the claim by MBIA that Merrill had committed breach of contract by promising the CDOs were worthy of an AAA rating when, it alleges, in reality they were not. When the CDOs lost value, MBIA wound up owing Merrill a large amount of money. Merrill disputed MBIA's claims.

In 2009 Rabobank sued Merrill over a CDO named Norma. Rabobank later claimed that its case against Merrill was very similar to the SEC's fraud charges against Goldman Sachs and its Abacaus CDOs. Rabobank alleged that a hedge fund named Magnetar Capital had chosen assets to go into Norma, and allegedly bet against them, but that Merrill had not informed Rabobank of this fact. Instead, Rabobank alleges that Merrill told it that NIR Group was selecting the assets. When the CDO value tanked, Rabobank was left owing Merrill a large amount of money. Merrill disputed the arguments of Rabobank, with a spokesman claiming "The two matters are unrelated and the claims today are not only unfounded but weren't included in the Rabobank lawsuit filed nearly a year ago".

Sale to Bank of America

Significant losses were attributed to the drop in value of its large and unhedged mortgage portfolio in the form of collateralized debt obligations. Trading partners' loss of confidence in Merrill Lynch's solvency and ability to refinance short-term debt ultimately led to its sale. During the week of September 8, 2008, Lehman Brothers came under severe liquidity pressures, with its survival in question. If Lehman Brothers failed, investors were afraid that the contagion could spread to the other surviving investment banks. On Sunday, September 14, 2008, Bank of America announced it was in talks to purchase Merrill Lynch for $38.25 billion in stock. Later that day, Merrill Lynch was sold to Bank of America for 0.8595 share of Bank of America common stock for each Merrill Lynch common share, or about $50 billion or $29 per share. This price represented a 70.1% premium over the September 12 closing price or a 38% premium over Merrill's book value of $21 a share, but also meant a discount of 61% from its September 2007 price.

Congressional testimony by Bank of America CEO Kenneth Lewis, as well as internal emails released by the House Oversight Committee, indicate that the merger was transacted under pressure from federal officials, who said that they would otherwise seek the replacement of Bank of America's management as a condition of any government assistance. In March 2009 it was reported that in 2008, Merrill Lynch received billions of dollars from insurance arrangements with AIG, including $6.8 billion from funds provided by United States taxpayers to bail out AIG.

Post-merger with Bank of America

After merging Merrill Lynch into its businesses, Bank of America continued to operate Merrill Lynch for its wealth management services and integrated Merrill Lynch's investment bank into the newly formed BofA Securities.

Regulatory actions

Analyst Research settlement
In 2002, Merrill Lynch settled for a fine of $100 million for publishing misleading research. As part of the agreement with the New York attorney general and other state securities regulators, Merrill Lynch agreed to increase research disclosure and work to decouple research from investment banking.

A well known analyst at Merrill Lynch named Henry Blodget wrote in company e-mails in which Blodget gave assessments about stocks which conflicted with what was publicly published by Merrill. In 2003, he was charged with civil securities fraud by the U.S. Securities and Exchange Commission. He settled without admitting or denying the allegations and was subsequently barred from the securities industry for life. He paid a $2 million fine and $2 million disgorgement.

The CEO at that time, David Komansky, said, "I want ... to publicly apologize to our clients, our shareholders, and our employees," for the company falling short of its professional standards in research.

Enron/Merrill Lynch Nigerian barge
In 2004 convictions of Merrill executives marked the only instance in the Enron investigation where the government criminally charged any officials from the banks and securities firms that allegedly helped the energy giant execute its accounting fraud. The case revolved around a 1999 transaction involving Merrill, Enron and the sale of some electricity-producing barges off the coast of Nigeria. The charges alleged that the 1999 sale of an interest in Nigerian energy barges by an Enron entity to Merrill Lynch was a sham that allowed Enron to illegally book about $12 million in pretax profit, when in fact there was no real sale and no real profit.

Four former Merrill top executives and two former midlevel Enron officials faced conspiracy and fraud charges. Merrill cut its own deal, firing bankers and agreeing to the outside oversight of its structured-finance transactions. It also settled civil fraud charges brought by the U.S. Securities and Exchange Commission, without admitting or denying fault.

Discrimination charges
On June 26, 2007, the U.S. Equal Employment Opportunity Commission (EEOC) brought suit against Merrill Lynch, alleging the firm discriminated against Dr. Majid Borumand because of his Iranian nationality and Islamic religion, with "reckless disregard" for his protected civil rights. The EEOC lawsuit maintains that violations by members of the firm were intentional and committed with malice. In another case concerning mistreatment of another Iranian employee by Merrill Lynch on July 20, 2007, a NASD arbitration panel ordered Merrill Lynch to pay its former Iranian employee, Fariborz Zojaji, $1.6 million for firing him due to his Persian ethnicity. Merrill Lynch's actions prompted reactions from both the National Iranian-American council, and the American-Arab Anti-Discrimination Committee.

In its June 2008 issue, Diversity Inc. named Merrill Lynch one of the top 10 companies for lesbian, gay, bisexual, and transgender employees, and the seventh-best top company in the US for diversity overall. In 2007, Merrill Lynch was named the second-best company in the US for people with disabilities by Diversity Magazine. As of June 5, 2008, Merrill Lynch has created the West Asian, Middle Eastern and North African (WAMENA) Professional Network to help support and provide additional resources for employees of diverse backgrounds. In May 2008, Merrill Lynch was named the No.1 US company for "Diverse College Graduates" by Diversity Edge magazine, edging out Microsoft for the top spot on the rankings.

New Jersey appeals court on August 13, 2008, rendered a ruling against Merrill Lynch in a discrimination lawsuit filed by a gay employee.

Market timing settlement
In 2002 Merrill Lynch settled for a $10 million civil penalty as a result of improper activities that took place out of the firm's Fort Lee New Jersey office. Three financial advisors, and a fourth who was involved to a lesser degree, placed 12,457 trades for a client Millennium Partners in at least 521 mutual funds and 63 mutual fund sub-accounts of at least 40 variable annuities. Millennium made profits in over half of the funds and fund sub-accounts. In those funds where Millennium made profits, its gains totalled about $60 million. Merrill Lynch failed to reasonably supervise these financial advisers, whose market timing siphoned short-term profits out of mutual funds and harmed long-term investors.

2008 bonus payments
Merrill Lynch arranged for payment of billions in bonuses for 2008 performance in what appeared to be "special timing", despite reported losses of $27 billion. These bonuses totalling $3.6 billion were one-third of the money they received from the feds' TARP bailout.

See also

 Broker-dealer
 Calibuso, et al. v. Bank of America Corp., et al.
 Credit crunch
 Global settlement
 Liquidity crisis
 Merrill Lynch, Pierce, Fenner & Smith, Inc. v. Dabit, a 2006 Supreme Court case involving securities fraud claims.
 Merrill Lynch, Pierce, Fenner & Smith Inc. v. Manning, a 2016 Supreme Court case involving naked short selling claims.
 Merrill Lynch's Application
 Primary dealers
 World Wealth Report

References

Further reading

External links
 Official website
 Total Merrill Website
 Merrill Lynch & Co., Inc. Company Profile—Yahoo! Finance

 
1914 establishments in New York City
2009 mergers and acquisitions
Bank of America legacy banks
Banks based in New York City
Brokerage firms
Companies formerly listed on the New York Stock Exchange
Financial services companies established in 1914
Banks established in 1914
Former investment banks of the United States
Investment management companies of the United States
Online brokerages
Primary dealers
Subprime mortgage crisis
Merrill family